Edwin Forest "Eddie" Carr (April 27, 1923 - January 7, 2011) was an American professional football defensive back who player three season  the All-America Football Conference for the San Francisco 49ers. Carr played in a total of 30 career games, while making 3 starts. Carr died on January 7, 2011, at the age of 87.

References

1923 births
San Francisco 49ers players
American football defensive backs
2011 deaths
American football running backs